Two submarines of the United States Navy have been named USS Swordfish after the swordfish, a large fish with a long, swordlike beak and a high dorsal fin.

 , a  commissioned in 1939 and sunk in 1945, was the first United States submarine to sink a Japanese ship during World War II.

United States Navy ship names